Caleido is an  tall, 36-story skyscraper in Madrid. It is popularly known as Quinta Torre (Fifth Tower) as it stands close to the other four skyscrapers of the Cuatro Torres Business Area (CTBA) complex along the Paseo de la Castellana. As of 2021, Instituto de Empresa (IE) is the main tenant. Its construction started in April 2017 and the tower was formally completed on 19 October, 2021.

It occupies the former site of the Centro Internacional de Convenciones de la Ciudad de Madrid. It is the fifth tallest building in Madrid and seventh tallest in Spain.

The building was designed by architecture firms Fenwick Iribarren and Serrano-Suñer Arquitectura. The main contractor was OHL Desarrollos.

References 

Skyscrapers in Madrid
Skyscraper office buildings in Madrid
Buildings and structures in Fuencarral-El Pardo District, Madrid